Coscomatepec is a municipality in Veracruz, Mexico. It is located in the mountainous central zone of the state, about 50 km from the state capital Xalapa.

The municipality of Coscomatepec is bordered to the north by Alpatlahuac and Calcahualco, to the south by La Perla and Chocaman, to the east by Huatusco and to the west by Calcahualco and La Perla.

Its principal products are maize, beans and potatoes.

In Coscomatepec, in June takes place the celebration in honor of San Juan Bautista, patron of the town.

The weather in Coscomatepec is cold all year with rains in summer and autumn.

References

External links 

  Municipal Official webpage
  Municipal Official Information

Municipalities of Veracruz